asyDNS Technologies Inc. is a Canadian Internet service provider which supplies DNS and web hosting services and operates a mail service called EasyMail. The company is headquartered in Toronto, Ontario.

Co-founder Mark Jeftovic, author of the book Managing Mission - Critical Domains and DNS, maintains a blog in which he writes about news and issues related to easyDNS and about internet domains in general.

History

easyDNS was co-founded in 1998 by Mark Jeftovic, Colin Viebrock and John Schmidt. 

On March 2, 2000, easyDNS became an affiliate of ICANN accredited registrar OpenSRS (now Tucows).

In 2003 easyDNS became directly accredited via ICANN. That year the company began accepting payment by E-gold.

In April 2013, easyDNS started accepting Bitcoin as a payment method. In June the company was one of several that were caught up in a day-long international Denial-of-service attack, although the attack was not aimed at an easyDNS customer.

In August 2014, easyDNS acquired DNS provider ZoneEdit.

In 2017, easyDNS started providing Ethereum Name Service (ENS) integration for domain names.

Controversies

WikiLeaks
In 2010, due to confusion with the similarly named EveryDNS, easyDNS was widely reported to have cut off DNS service to WikiLeaks. easyDNS subsequently was approached by WikiLeaks and agreed to host three domain names for WikiLeaks. Some easyDNS customers who disapproved of WikiLeaks threatened to change providers.

Police Intellectual Property Crime Unit
In October 2013, a request from the UK Police Intellectual Property Crime Unit requested they redirect torrentpond.com to an IP address controlled by the PIPCU.

This request was refused due to having no legal basis. easyDNS suggested that registrars that complied with the PIPCU's requests may have violated ICANN's transfer policies. and filed a request for enforcement with ICANN. Following this request, three domains suspended by Public Domain Registry were ordered to be transferred to easyDNS.

Illegal pharmaceutical sales and fatality
In 2014, easyDNS was at the centre of controversy due to its policy of refusing to take down web pages for unlicensed online pharmaceutical companies accused of selling controlled substances without a prescription. easyDNS CEO Mark Jeftovic referred to the National Association of Boards of Pharmacy as a "batch of clowns" after it sent easyDNS and other registrars a letter ordering them to take down the websites unlicensed pharmacies without court orders and to prevent those domains from transferring to other registrars. Doing so would put registrars in violation of their ICANN Registrar Accreditation Agreements.

easyDNS clarified its policy after a man died after taking a "controlled substance" codeine phosphate purchased without a prescription from airmailchemist.com, an online drug seller registered through asyDNS Technologies Inc. easyDNS was not aware of airmailchemist’s presence on the system, and had not been informed by ICANN of the circumstances around the man’s death until contacted by a reporter. Upon learning of the death, easyDNS immediately initiated contact with the FDA and added a requirement that online pharmacies be licensed by one of three online pharmaceutical accreditation agencies.

Leaked contact details 
From October 25, 2018 to October 26, the domain contact details of 1,500 domain owners using easyDNS were leaked in Whois query results due to a bug in a system provided by the second largest domain registrar in the world, Tucows, which easyDNS uses as its backend to manage domain names.

References

External links 
 

Alternative Internet DNS services
Dynamic DNS
Internet service providers of Canada